Events in the year 2022 in Cameroon.

Incumbents 

 President: Paul Biya
 Prime Minister: Joseph Ngute

Events 
Ongoing — COVID-19 pandemic in Cameroon

 23 January – Yaoundé nightclub fire: At least 16 people are killed and eight others are injured in a fire caused by fireworks at a nightclub in Yaoundé.
 24 January - Yaoundé stadium disaster: Eight people are killed in a crowd crush at Olembe Stadium in Yaoundé.
 6 February - 2021 Africa Cup of Nations: In association football, Senegal win their first international trophy after beating Egypt on penalties in the final at the Olembe Stadium in Yaoundé, Cameroon. Senegalese forward Sadio Mané is named the tournament's Best Player.
 2 March - Anglophone rebels bomb a car in the Ekondo-Titi commune of Southwest Cameroon, killing seven people, including the mayor and a lieutenant.
 14 March - Cameroon bans shisha smoking, becoming the sixth African country to do so.
 12 April - Jeune Afrique reveals that the defence ministers of Russia and Cameroon sign a new military cooperation agreement, renewing a similar agreement signed in 2015.
 11 May - A small plane crashes in Cameroon with eleven people on board. It is unknown if any casualties occurred.
 29 May - Twenty-four people are killed and more than 60 injured in an attack by Anglophone rebels in Cameroon.
 7 June - Five Cameroonian soldiers are killed in an attack by Ambazonian separatists in Kouoptamo district.
 22 June - Anglophone Ambazonia rebels kill between 26 and 32 civilians in Akwaya, Cameroon.
 25 June - Akwaya massacre: Twenty-six people are killed in an attack in Akwaya district, Southwest region, Cameroon.
 9 August - Four civilians and a soldier are killed, and another civilian is wounded, during three separate attacks by Boko Haram gunmen in the Far North Region, Cameroon.
 6 September - Six people are killed and eight others are injured when separatists open fire on a public bus in South West, Cameroon.

Deaths 

 May 21 – Fon Angwafo III of Mankon, 97, traditional ruler
 May 31 - Jacques N'Guea, 66, footballer
 June 21 - Pierre Narcisse, 45, singer
 July 2 - Félix Tonye Mbog, 88, politician
 July 12 - Lekeaka Oliver, 53, separatist leader
 August 9 - Dakolé Daïssala, politician

See also 

COVID-19 pandemic in Africa
African Continental Free Trade Area

References 

 
2020s in Cameroon
Years of the 21st century in Cameroon
Cameroon
Cameroon